NGC 980 is a lenticular galaxy located in the constellation Andromeda about 256 million light years from the Milky Way. It was discovered by the German - British astronomer William Herschel in 1786.

iPTF 13ebh, a type Ia supernova, occurred in NGC 980.

References 

Lenticular galaxies
0980
Andromeda (constellation)
009831